Daviesia pteroclada is a species of flowering plant in the family Fabaceae and is endemic to the south-west of Western Australia. It is a leafless, broom-like, glabrous shrub, its branchlets modified as cladodes, and has orange and dark red flowers.

Description

Taxonomy
Daviesia pteroclada was first formally described in 1995 by Michael Crisp in Australian Systematic Botany from specimens collected near Green Head by Charles Chapman in 1978. The specific epithet (pteroclada) means "winged shoot".

Distribution and habitat
This daviesia grows in heathy woodland between Eneabba and Mount Lesueur in the Geraldton Sandplains biogeographic region of south-western Western Australia.

Conservation status 
Daviesia pteroclada is listed as "Priority Three" by the Government of Western Australia Department of Biodiversity, Conservation and Attractions, meaning that it is poorly known and known from only a few locations but is not under imminent threat.

References 

pteroclada
Taxa named by Michael Crisp
Plants described in 1995
Flora of Western Australia